Edina is a city in District 1 of Grand Bassa County, Liberia. Settled in 1832, Samuel A.L. Johnson has been the city's mayor since 2018. The community is named after Edinburgh, Scotland, which provided monetary support for the foundation of the settlement.

History
Edina was founded as a colony of the American Colonization Society in 1832. Edina colony was later given to the United Colonization Societies of New York and Pennsylvania and became part of the Bassa Cove colony in 1837. On October 22, 1836, a school was opened and in December 1837, a church was founded in the colony. A second church opened in late 1839 while the Baptists started a mission at Edina.

Edina is listed as one of the original settlements comprising the Commonwealth of Liberia in the 1839 Constitution, which was drafted by the American Colonization Society.

Edina was the birthplace of the 12th President of Liberia, Joseph James Cheeseman. One of the earliest settlers of Edina was Charles R.H. Johnson, a son of Elijah Johnson who was one of the pioneers that played significant roles in establishing Liberia.

In 2002, an outbreak of diarrhea killed six people in and around the city. Steel manufacturer Mittal began subsidising medical care in the city in 2007.

The peace activist Etweda Cooper served as mayor from 2010 to 2012.

Details

Edina is in District 1 of Grand Bassa County along the St. John River. Lying along the Atlantic coast in the central part of Liberian coastline, about 40 miles south of the capital of Monrovia, it is inhabited by many fishermen. Situated at sea level, the greater Edina area has a population of 15,628.

Edina Public Health Center, a government run medical clinic, is located in the city. The Liberian government believes Edina lies at the southern end of possible off-shore oil deposits. It is among the oldest communities in the county.

See also
 Port Cresson massacre

References

External links
 The Page Families of Frederick (now Clarke) County
  The library of ... sir George Grey, K.C.B. (a catalogue, compiled by W.H.I. Bleek, sir G. Grey and J. Cameron)
 The Republic of Liberia: Its Geography, Climate, Soil and Productions

Populated places in Liberia
Populated coastal places in Liberia
Grand Bassa County
Populated places established in 1832
Populated places established by Americo-Liberians
1832 establishments in Africa